Cyrtodactylus pinlaungensis, the Pinlaung bent-toed gecko, is a species of gecko endemic to Myanmar.

References

Cyrtodactylus
Reptiles described in 2019
Reptiles of Myanmar
Endemic fauna of Myanmar